The 1987 VFL season was the 91st season of the Victorian Football League (VFL). The season ran from 27 March until 26 September, and comprised a 22-game home-and-away season followed by a finals series featuring the top five clubs.

The season saw the beginning of a decade-long period of expansion of the Victorian league to the rest of Australia, with the admission of two newly established clubs: the West Coast Eagles, based in Perth, Western Australia, and the Brisbane Bears, based in South East Queensland. While the league remained the highest level senior Australian rules football competition and administrative body in Victoria, it also became the de facto highest level senior competition in Australia, with representation across four states. In the pre-season, the first modern VFL draft was held.

The premiership was won by the Carlton Football Club for the 15th time, after it defeated  by 33 points in the 1987 VFL Grand Final.

Night Series
 defeated  8.10 (58) to 8.6 (54), to win the Night Series Grand Final at VFL Park.

Premiership season

Round 1

|- bgcolor="#CCCCFF"
| Home team
| Home team score
| Away team
| Away team score
| Venue
| Crowd
| Date
|- bgcolor="#FFFFFF"
| 
| 15.14 (104)
| 
| 19.23 (137)
| MCG
| 14,096
| Friday 27 March 1987
|- bgcolor="#FFFFFF"
| 
| 11.8 (74)
| 
| 25.15 (165)
| Victoria Park
| 17,129
| Saturday 28 March 1987
|- bgcolor="#FFFFFF"
| 
| 15.14 (104)
| 
| 22.17 (149)
| Princes Park
| 20,192
| Saturday 28 March 1987
|- bgcolor="#FFFFFF"
| 
| 15.11 (101)
| 
| 14.18 (102)
| Moorabbin Oval
| 15,867
| Saturday 28 March 1987
|- bgcolor="#FFFFFF"
| 
| 19.14 (128)
| 
| 12.17 (89)
| MCG
| 18,012
| Saturday 28 March 1987
|- bgcolor="#FFFFFF"
| 
| 9.8 (62)
| 
| 19.7 (121)
| VFL Park
| 22,550
| Saturday 28 March 1987
|- bgcolor="#FFFFFF"
| 
| 20.13 (133)
| 
| 16.23 (119)
| Subiaco Oval
| 23,897 
| Sunday 29 March 1987

Round 2

|- bgcolor="#CCCCFF"
| Home team
| Home team score
| Away team
| Away team score
| Venue
| Crowd
| Date
|- bgcolor="#FFFFFF"
| 
| 13.14 (92)
| 
| 7.17 (59)
| MCG
| 19,035
| Friday 3 April 1987
|- bgcolor="#FFFFFF"
| 
| 23.21 (159)
| 
| 17.13 (115)
| Princes Park
| 11,584
| Saturday 4 April 1987
|- bgcolor="#FFFFFF"
| 
| 17.17 (119)
| 
| 17.12 (114)
| Windy Hill
| 19,959
| Saturday 4 April 1987
|- bgcolor="#FFFFFF"
| 
| 13.15 (93)
| 
| 23.17 (155)
| MCG
| 17,824
| Saturday 4 April 1987
|- bgcolor="#FFFFFF"
| 
| 19.17 (131)
| 
| 23.12 (150)
| Kardinia Park
| 14,480
| Saturday 4 April 1987
|- bgcolor="#FFFFFF"
| 
| 17.5 (107)
| 
| 16.18 (114)
| VFL Park
| 29,481
| Saturday 4 April 1987
|- bgcolor="#FFFFFF"
| 
| 27.25 (187)
| 
| 11.13 (79)
| SCG
| 15,268
| Sunday 5 April 1987

Round 3

|- bgcolor="#CCCCFF"
| Home team
| Home team score
| Away team
| Away team score
| Venue
| Crowd
| Date
|- bgcolor="#FFFFFF"
| 
| 20.9 (129)
| 
| 7.13 (55)
| VFL Park
| 10,043
| Friday 10 April 1987
|- bgcolor="#FFFFFF"
| 
| 18.20 (128)
| 
| 13.16 (94)
| Kardinia Park
| 15,391
| Saturday 11 April 1987
|- bgcolor="#FFFFFF"
| 
| 19.16 (130)
| 
| 12.12 (84)
| MCG
| 27,528
| Saturday 11 April 1987
|- bgcolor="#FFFFFF"
| 
| 20.25 (145)
| 
| 10.8 (68)
| Princes Park
| 14,267
| Saturday 11 April 1987
|- bgcolor="#FFFFFF"
| 
| 5.10 (40)
| 
| 18.19 (127)
| Western Oval
| 14,492
| Saturday 11 April 1987
|- bgcolor="#FFFFFF"
| 
| 21.7 (133)
| 
| 11.17 (83)
| Moorabbin Oval
| 12,717
| Saturday 11 April 1987
|- bgcolor="#FFFFFF"
| 
| 14.13 (97)
| 
| 18.16 (124)
| Subiaco Oval
| 35,719
| Sunday 12 April 1987

Round 4

|- bgcolor="#CCCCFF"
| Home team
| Home team score
| Away team
| Away team score
| Venue
| Crowd
| Date
|- bgcolor="#FFFFFF"
| 
| 21.13 (139)
| 
| 14.8 (92)
| MCG
| 25,465
| 18 April 1987
|- bgcolor="#FFFFFF"
| 
| 18.19 (127)
| 
| 19.22 (136)
| Kardinia Park
| 18,614
| 18 April 1987
|- bgcolor="#FFFFFF"
| 
| 29.17 (191)
| 
| 15.14 (104)
| Princes Park
| 21,746
| 18 April 1987
|- bgcolor="#FFFFFF"
| 
| 16.18 (114)
| 
| 20.9 (129)
| Carrara Stadium
| 17,795
| 19 April 1987
|- bgcolor="#FFFFFF"
| 
| 14.12 (96)
| 
| 7.13 (55)
| Western Oval
| 10,425
| 20 April 1987
|- bgcolor="#FFFFFF"
| 
| 17.11 (113)
| 
| 9.12 (66)
| Windy Hill
| 24,264
| 20 April 1987
|- bgcolor="#FFFFFF"
| 
| 16.14 (110)
| 
| 15.10 (100)
| VFL Park
| 36,749
| 20 April 1987

Round 5

|- bgcolor="#CCCCFF"
| Home team
| Home team score
| Away team
| Away team score
| Venue
| Crowd
| Date
|- bgcolor="#FFFFFF"
| 
| 18.19 (127)
| 
| 16.14 (110)
| MCG
| 16,078
| 24 April 1987
|- bgcolor="#FFFFFF"
| 
| 19.12 (126)
| 
| 21.20 (146)
| MCG
| 22,154
| 25 April 1987
|- bgcolor="#FFFFFF"
| 
| 13.14 (92)
| 
| 15.14 (104)
| Princes Park
| 11,068
| 25 April 1987
|- bgcolor="#FFFFFF"
| 
| 14.5 (89)
| 
| 12.13 (85)
| Victoria Park
| 22,039
| 25 April 1987
|- bgcolor="#FFFFFF"
| 
| 29.10 (184)
| 
| 17.7 (109)
| Kardinia Park
| 18,220
| 25 April 1987
|- bgcolor="#FFFFFF"
| 
| 17.14 (116)
| 
| 9.8 (62)
| VFL Park
| 56,124
| 25 April 1987
|- bgcolor="#FFFFFF"
| 
| 12.14 (86)
| 
| 12.9 (81)
| Carrara Stadium
| 7,451
| 26 April 1987

Round 6

|- bgcolor="#CCCCFF"
| Home team
| Home team score
| Away team
| Away team score
| Venue
| Crowd
| Date
|- bgcolor="#FFFFFF"
| 
| 13.16 (94)
| 
| 12.15 (87)
| SCG
| 33,659
| 1 May 1987
|- bgcolor="#FFFFFF"
| 
| 16.14 (110)
| 
| 9.15 (69)
| MCG
| 18,482
| 2 May 1987
|- bgcolor="#FFFFFF"
| 
| 14.12 (96)
| 
| 13.18 (96)
| Windy Hill
| 15,395
| 2 May 1987
|- bgcolor="#FFFFFF"
| 
| 16.9 (105)
| 
| 8.10 (58)
| Victoria Park
| 14,689
| 2 May 1987
|- bgcolor="#FFFFFF"
| 
| 11.12 (78)
| 
| 4.10 (34)
| VFL Park
| 12,834
| 2 May 1987
|- bgcolor="#FFFFFF"
| 
| 24.18 (162)
| 
| 13.10 (88)
| Subiaco Oval
| 28,330
| 3 May 1987
|- bgcolor="#FFFFFF"
| 
| 16.17 (113)
| 
| 15.14 (104)
| MCG
| 18,694
| 3 May 1987

Round 7

|- bgcolor="#CCCCFF"
| Home team
| Home team score
| Away team
| Away team score
| Venue
| Crowd
| Date
|- bgcolor="#FFFFFF"
| 
| 10.21 (81)
| 
| 8.14 (62)
| WACA Ground
| 25,799
| 8 May 1987
|- bgcolor="#FFFFFF"
| 
| 13.10 (88)
| 
| 19.8 (122)
| Western Oval
| 13,395
| 9 May 1987
|- bgcolor="#FFFFFF"
| 
| 21.11 (137)
| 
| 17.12 (114)
| Moorabbin Oval
| 14,909
| 9 May 1987
|- bgcolor="#FFFFFF"
| 
| 25.9 (159)
| 
| 21.8 (134)
| Princes Park
| 14,564
| 9 May 1987
|- bgcolor="#FFFFFF"
| 
| 18.18 (126)
| 
| 12.8 (80)
| MCG
| 49,215
| 9 May 1987
|- bgcolor="#FFFFFF"
| 
| 22.18 (150)
| 
| 14.10 (94)
| VFL Park
| 31,000
| 9 May 1987
|- bgcolor="#FFFFFF"
| 
| 18.14 (122)
| 
| 17.12 (114)
| SCG
| 22,273
| 10 May 1987

Round 8

|- bgcolor="#CCCCFF"
| Home team
| Home team score
| Away team
| Away team score
| Venue
| Crowd
| Date
|- bgcolor="#FFFFFF"
| 
| 13.9 (87)
| 
| 16.20 (116)
| SCG
| 24,858
| 15 May 1987
|- bgcolor="#FFFFFF"
| 
| 14.13 (97)
| 
| 6.13 (49)
| Moorabbin Oval
| 11,537
| 16 May 1987
|- bgcolor="#FFFFFF"
| 
| 17.10 (112)
| 
| 10.5 (65)
| Princes Park
| 9,532
| 16 May 1987
|- bgcolor="#FFFFFF"
| 
| 11.15 (81)
| 
| 15.15 (105)
| MCG
| 16,325
| 16 May 1987
|- bgcolor="#FFFFFF"
| 
| 10.8 (68)
| 
| 14.10 (94)
| VFL Park
| 28,085
| 16 May 1987
|- bgcolor="#FFFFFF"
| 
| 22.12 (144)
| 
| 15.19 (109)
| Carrara Stadium
| 7,944
| 17 May 1987
|- bgcolor="#FFFFFF"
| 
| 10.11 (71)
| 
| 15.15 (105)
| MCG
| 26,684
| 17 May 1987

Round 9

|- bgcolor="#CCCCFF"
| Home team
| Home team score
| Away team
| Away team score
| Venue
| Crowd
| Date
|- bgcolor="#FFFFFF"
| 
| 13.16 (94)
| 
| 17.26 (128)
| MCG
| 14,220
| 22 May 1987
|- bgcolor="#FFFFFF"
| 
| 15.15 (105)
| 
| 15.9 (99)
| Victoria Park
| 18,173
| 23 May 1987
|- bgcolor="#FFFFFF"
| 
| 12.20 (92)
| 
| 9.16 (70)
| Princes Park
| 28,422
| 23 May 1987
|- bgcolor="#FFFFFF"
| 
| 14.19 (103)
| 
| 10.11 (71)
| Western Oval
| 10,673
| 23 May 1987
|- bgcolor="#FFFFFF"
| 
| 25.15 (165)
| 
| 7.9 (51)
| VFL Park
| 32,634
| 23 May 1987
|- bgcolor="#FFFFFF"
| 
| 15.14 (104)
| 
| 11.13 (79)
| Kardinia Park
| 24,476
| 24 May 1987
|- bgcolor="#FFFFFF"
| 
| 20.15 (135)
| 
| 18.11 (119)
| Subiaco Oval
| 23,366
| 24 May 1987

Round 10

|- bgcolor="#CCCCFF"
| Home team
| Home team score
| Away team
| Away team score
| Venue
| Crowd
| Date
|- bgcolor="#FFFFFF"
| 
| 11.14 (80)
| 
| 15.12 (102)
| Windy Hill
| 13,862
| 30 May 1987
|- bgcolor="#FFFFFF"
| 
| 14.13 (97)
| 
| 18.10 (118)
| MCG
| 16,854
| 30 May 1987
|- bgcolor="#FFFFFF"
| 
| 10.19 (79)
| 
| 7.4 (46)
| Western Oval
| 12,722
| 30 May 1987
|- bgcolor="#FFFFFF"
| 
| 27.22 (184)
| 
| 12.9 (81)
| Princes Park
| 13,790
| 30 May 1987
|- bgcolor="#FFFFFF"
| 
| 23.16 (154)
| 
| 15.8 (98)
| VFL Park
| 15,535
| 30 May 1987
|- bgcolor="#FFFFFF"
| 
| 20.16 (136)
| 
| 23.7 (145)
| SCG
| 20,084
| 31 May 1987
|- bgcolor="#FFFFFF"
| 
| 19.23 (137)
| 
| 11.14 (80)
| Subiaco Oval
| 38,274
| 1 June 1987

Round 11

|- bgcolor="#CCCCFF"
| Home team
| Home team score
| Away team
| Away team score
| Venue
| Crowd
| Date
|- bgcolor="#FFFFFF"
| 
| 18.13 (121)
| 
| 15.9 (99)
| Western Oval
| 15,089
| 6 June 1987
|- bgcolor="#FFFFFF"
| 
| 16.10 (106)
| 
| 18.13 (121)
| Moorabbin Oval
| 23,725
| 6 June 1987
|- bgcolor="#FFFFFF"
| 
| 14.7 (91)
| 
| 17.11 (113)
| VFL Park
| 23,606
| 6 June 1987
|- bgcolor="#FFFFFF"
| 
| 9.10 (64)
| 
| 19.23 (137)
| Carrara Stadium
| 11,840
| 7 June 1987
|- bgcolor="#FFFFFF"
| 
| 18.15 (123)
| 
| 22.17 (149)
| Princes Park
| 12,580
| 8 June 1987
|- bgcolor="#FFFFFF"
| 
| 13.12 (90)
| 
| 21.9 (135)
| MCG
| 49,812
| 8 June 1987
|- bgcolor="#FFFFFF"
| 
| 17.13 (115)
| 
| 17.8 (110)
| VFL Park
| 33,150
| 8 June 1987

Round 12

|- bgcolor="#CCCCFF"
| Home team
| Home team score
| Away team
| Away team score
| Venue
| Crowd
| Date
|- bgcolor="#FFFFFF"
| 
| 15.10 (100)
| 
| 9.10 (64)
| MCG
| 23,944
| 12 June 1987
|- bgcolor="#FFFFFF"
| 
| 11.10 (76)
| 
| 17.10 (112)
| MCG
| 21,696
| 13 June 1987
|- bgcolor="#FFFFFF"
| 
| 13.13 (91)
| 
| 12.13 (85)
| Kardinia Park
| 17,483
| 13 June 1987
|- bgcolor="#FFFFFF"
| 
| 15.16 (106)
| 
| 11.14 (80)
| Victoria Park
| 17,840
| 13 June 1987
|- bgcolor="#FFFFFF"
| 
| 12.25 (97)
| 
| 14.12 (96)
| Princes Park
| 16,511
| 13 June 1987
|- bgcolor="#FFFFFF"
| 
| 11.8 (74)
| 
| 21.16 (142)
| VFL Park
| 16,279
| 13 June 1987
|- bgcolor="#FFFFFF"
| 
| 11.4 (70)
| 
| 24.21 (165)
| Carrara Stadium
| 7,284
| 14 June 1987

Round 13

|- bgcolor="#CCCCFF"
| Home team
| Home team score
| Away team
| Away team score
| Venue
| Crowd
| Date
|- bgcolor="#FFFFFF"
| 
| 16.18 (114)
| 
| 5.12 (42)
| WACA Ground
| 13,540
| 19 June 1987
|- bgcolor="#FFFFFF"
| 
| 6.8 (44)
| 
| 8.9 (57)
| Princes Park
| 7,596
| 20 June 1987
|- bgcolor="#FFFFFF"
| 
| 13.11 (89)
| 
| 8.2 (50)
| Western Oval
| 15,749
| 20 June 1987
|- bgcolor="#FFFFFF"
| 
| 4.3 (27)
| 
| 6.7 (43)
| MCG
| 15,916
| 20 June 1987
|- bgcolor="#FFFFFF"
| 
| 9.10 (64)
| 
| 3.9 (27)
| Windy Hill
| 8,832
| 20 June 1987
|- bgcolor="#FFFFFF"
| 
| 2.6 (18)
| 
| 10.12 (72)
| VFL Park
| 17,613
| 20 June 1987
|- bgcolor="#FFFFFF"
| 
| 20.14 (134)
| 
| 11.9 (75)
| SCG
| 17,760
| 21 June 1987

Round 14

|- bgcolor="#CCCCFF"
| Home team
| Home team score
| Away team
| Away team score
| Venue
| Crowd
| Date
|- bgcolor="#FFFFFF"
| 
| 14.17 (101)
| 
| 10.14 (74)
| SCG
| 20,133
| 26 June 1987
|- bgcolor="#FFFFFF"
| 
| 9.19 (73)
| 
| 9.15 (69)
| MCG
| 8,926
| 27 June 1987
|- bgcolor="#FFFFFF"
| 
| 13.20 (98)
| 
| 3.9 (27)
| Kardinia Park
| 13,661
| 27 June 1987
|- bgcolor="#FFFFFF"
| 
| 11.16 (82)
| 
| 4.10 (34)
| Princes Park
| 7,643
| 27 June 1987
|- bgcolor="#FFFFFF"
| 
| 7.10 (52)
| 
| 9.10 (64)
| Windy Hill
| 17,401
| 27 June 1987
|- bgcolor="#FFFFFF"
| 
| 12.8 (80)
| 
| 12.7 (79)
| VFL Park
| 44,385
| 27 June 1987
|- bgcolor="#FFFFFF"
| 
| 17.11 (113)
| 
| 23.13 (151)
| Carrara Stadium
| 7,716
| 28 June 1987

Round 15

|- bgcolor="#CCCCFF"
| Home team
| Home team score
| Away team
| Away team score
| Venue
| Crowd
| Date
|- bgcolor="#FFFFFF"
| 
| 18.10 (118)
| 
| 21.20 (146)
| WACA Ground
| 15,740
| 3 July 1987
|- bgcolor="#FFFFFF"
| 
| 15.20 (110)
| 
| 16.16 (112)
| MCG
| 17,108
| 4 July 1987
|- bgcolor="#FFFFFF"
| 
| 19.20 (134)
| 
| 11.11 (77)
| Princes Park
| 10,150
| 4 July 1987
|- bgcolor="#FFFFFF"
| 
| 20.14 (134)
| 
| 15.10 (100)
| Moorabbin Oval
| 15,201
| 4 July 1987
|- bgcolor="#FFFFFF"
| 
| 10.13 (73)
| 
| 16.10 (106)
| VFL Park
| 27,075
| 4 July 1987
|- bgcolor="#FFFFFF"
| 
| 18.11 (119)
| 
| 10.18 (78)
| Carrara Stadium
| 9,380
| 5 July 1987
|- bgcolor="#FFFFFF"
| 
| 20.16 (136)
| 
| 15.22 (112)
| MCG
| 47,813
| 5 July 1987

Rounds 16 and 17
Rounds 16 and 17 were played concurrently over three weekends: five matches were played on the weekends of 11 and 18 July, and four matches were played on the weekend of 25 July. This fixturing effectively gave each team one bye during the three-week period. However, the matches are still grouped into two complete rounds rather than three partial rounds, which results in a chronological anomaly in which six teams played their Round 17 matches before their Round 16 matches.

Round 17

|- bgcolor="#CCCCFF"
| Home team
| Home team score
| Away team
| Away team score
| Venue
| Crowd
| Date
|- bgcolor="#FFFFFF"
| 
| 15.17 (107)
| 
| 15.14 (104)
| WACA Ground
| 21,780
| 10 July 1987
|- bgcolor="#FFFFFF"
| 
| 25.12 (162)
| 
| 9.11 (65)
| Princes Park
| 14,429
| 11 July 1987
|- bgcolor="#FFFFFF"
| 
| 11.13 (79)
| 
| 27.14 (176)
| MCG
| 20,880
| 18 July 1987
|- bgcolor="#FFFFFF"
| 
| 18.6 (114)
| 
| 9.14 (68)
| VFL Park
| 20,354
| 18 July 1987
|- bgcolor="#FFFFFF"
| 
| 18.20 (128)
| 
| 14.5 (89)
| MCG
| 24,793
| 25 July 1987
|- bgcolor="#FFFFFF"
| 
| 17.29 (131)
| 
| 16.10 (106)
| Princes Park
| 5,824
| 25 July 1987
|- bgcolor="#FFFFFF"
| 
| 36.20 (236)
| 
| 11.7 (73)
| SCG
| 24,199
| 26 July 1987

Round 18

|- bgcolor="#CCCCFF"
| Home team
| Home team score
| Away team
| Away team score
| Venue
| Crowd
| Date
|- bgcolor="#FFFFFF"
| 
| 31.12 (198)
| 
| 15.17 (107)
| SCG
| 17,157
| 31 July 1987
|- bgcolor="#FFFFFF"
| 
| 20.9 (129)
| 
| 12.15 (87)
| Princes Park
| 8,678
| 1 August 1987
|- bgcolor="#FFFFFF"
| 
| 15.16 (106)
| 
| 11.15 (81)
| Moorabbin Oval
| 18,968
| 1 August 1987
|- bgcolor="#FFFFFF"
| 
| 9.11 (65)
| 
| 8.6 (54)
| Western Oval
| 14,514
| 1 August 1987
|- bgcolor="#FFFFFF"
| 
| 22.21 (153)
| 
| 14.15 (99)
| MCG
| 10,307
| 1 August 1987
|- bgcolor="#FFFFFF"
| 
| 10.9 (69)
| 
| 10.10 (70)
| VFL Park
| 29,761
| 1 August 1987
|- bgcolor="#FFFFFF"
| 
| 17.13 (115)
| 
| 17.12 (114)
| Subiaco Oval
| 24,502
| 2 August 1987

Round 19

|- bgcolor="#CCCCFF"
| Home team
| Home team score
| Away team
| Away team score
| Venue
| Crowd
| Date
|- bgcolor="#FFFFFF"
| 
| 15.19 (109)
| 
| 18.12 (120)
| WACA Ground
| 22,540
| 7 August 1987
|- bgcolor="#FFFFFF"
| 
| 17.21 (123)
| 
| 8.7 (55)
| Princes Park
| 32,058
| 8 August 1987
|- bgcolor="#FFFFFF"
| 
| 15.10 (100)
| 
| 17.17 (119)
| MCG
| 15,899
| 8 August 1987
|- bgcolor="#FFFFFF"
| 
| 15.14 (104)
| 
| 15.11 (101)
| Moorabbin Oval
| 23,080
| 8 August 1987
|- bgcolor="#FFFFFF"
| 
| 12.20 (92)
| 
| 9.11 (65)
| Kardinia Park
| 18,316
| 8 August 1987
|- bgcolor="#FFFFFF"
| 
| 26.9 (165)
| 
| 16.9 (105)
| VFL Park
| 14,692
| 8 August 1987
|- bgcolor="#FFFFFF"
| 
| 11.11 (77)
| 
| 14.16 (100)
| Carrara Stadium
| 9,166
| 9 August 1987

Round 20

|- bgcolor="#CCCCFF"
| Home team
| Home team score
| Away team
| Away team score
| Venue
| Crowd
| Date
|- bgcolor="#FFFFFF"
| 
| 20.22 (142)
| 
| 15.7 (97)
| Princes Park
| 20,551
| 15 August 1987
|- bgcolor="#FFFFFF"
| 
| 20.7 (127)
| 
| 11.20 (86)
| Windy Hill
| 12,510
| 15 August 1987
|- bgcolor="#FFFFFF"
| 
| 8.11 (59)
| 
| 15.24 (114)
| Victoria Park
| 16,285
| 15 August 1987
|- bgcolor="#FFFFFF"
| 
| 18.17 (125)
| 
| 18.17 (125)
| MCG
| 18,921
| 15 August 1987
|- bgcolor="#FFFFFF"
| 
| 13.10 (88)
| 
| 24.12 (156)
| Kardinia Park
| 22,219
| 15 August 1987
|- bgcolor="#FFFFFF"
| 
| 19.19 (133)
| 
| 8.9 (57)
| VFL Park
| 27,589
| 15 August 1987
|- bgcolor="#FFFFFF"
| 
| 18.11 (119)
| 
| 21.14 (140)
| Carrara Stadium
| 4,859
| 16 August 1987

Round 21

|- bgcolor="#CCCCFF"
| Home team
| Home team score
| Away team
| Away team score
| Venue
| Crowd
| Date
|- bgcolor="#FFFFFF"
| 
| 18.21 (129)
| 
| 10.8 (68)
| MCG
| 21,048
| 21 August 1987
|- bgcolor="#FFFFFF"
| 
| 18.14 (122)
| 
| 11.18 (84)
| MCG
| 15,073
| 22 August 1987
|- bgcolor="#FFFFFF"
| 
| 15.17 (107)
| 
| 8.10 (58)
| Moorabbin Oval
| 24,335
| 22 August 1987
|- bgcolor="#FFFFFF"
| 
| 12.12 (84)
| 
| 17.22 (124)
| Princes Park
| 16,126
| 22 August 1987
|- bgcolor="#FFFFFF"
| 
| 9.10 (64)
| 
| 17.12 (114)
| VFL Park
| 27,046
| 22 August 1987
|- bgcolor="#FFFFFF"
| 
| 10.11 (71)
| 
| 22.21 (153)
| Carrara Stadium
| 6,754
| 23 August 1987
|- bgcolor="#FFFFFF"
| 
| 18.14 (122)
| 
| 18.23 (131)
| SCG
| 23,953
| 23 August 1987

Round 22
The final round of the 1987 VFL home-and-away season turned out to be one of the most dramatic and significant in VFL/AFL history. The composition of the final five would be determined by a number of scenarios:
 If Carlton defeated North Melbourne, they would secure the minor premiership and advance straight to the second semi-final
 Hawthorn would win the minor premiership if they beat Geelong and Carlton lost to North
 North could grab third place - and hence the "double chance" - if it beat Carlton and Sydney lost to Fitzroy
 Going into the final round, Geelong held fifth spot, ahead of Footscray on percentage, with Melbourne two premiership points behind both teams. Hence, if the Cats could beat Hawthorn, they would secure a finals berth, but if they lost, then the winner out of Melbourne and Footscray would advance to the finals.

The round began on the Friday night with Richmond and the fledgling Brisbane Bears playing for the wooden spoon; the Bears won easily to ensure they didn't come last in their first season. The significant matches to determine the final five were all played on Saturday afternoon, and they were all thrillers.

Ladder

Finals series

Week one

Week two

Week three

Week four

Player Statistics and Awards

Coleman Medal
Larger numbers indicate number of goals scored in each round. Subscript numbers indicate total cumulative goals scored through that round.
Numbers highlighted in blue indicates the player led the Coleman Medal at the end of that round.
Numbers underlined indicates the player did not play in that round.

Brownlow Medal count

 The Norm Smith Medal was awarded to David Rhys-Jones of Carlton.
  won the reserves premiership. Carlton 18.17 (125) defeated  15.15 (105) in the grand final, held as a curtain-raiser to the seniors Grand Final on 26 September at the Melbourne Cricket Ground.

Notable events
 This season saw the introduction of two new interstate sides: the West Coast Eagles, based in Perth, Western Australia, and the Brisbane Bears, based in Gold Coast, Queensland. They were the first new clubs to join the league since the expansion of 1925, and the first time the league changed from twelve teams since 1943. The clubs were admitted to the league in a meeting on 1 October 1986, with West Coast admitted by an 8–4 majority of the twelve clubs, and Brisbane admitted unanimously. The two new clubs each paid a $A4 million licence fee which was divided equally amongst the existing twelve clubs, many of whom were in desperate need of such a cash injection.
 When the Seven Network refused to offer a significant increase on its previous deal – which the VFL thought was warranted, given the broader audience that interstate expansion would bring – the VFL sold the television rights to on-seller Broadcom, who sold them to the ABC and satellite network Sportsplay. The deals lasted one year, and Seven purchased the exclusive rights back from Broadcom in 1988 at almost double the 1986 rate. Free-to-air broadcasts, alongside the nationally aired games on ABC (and all locally broadcast games via ABV in Victoria), were split on state lines with Seven retaining broadcasts for Western Australia via TVW-7, the games were broadcast as well on SBS Television and The Prime Network (New South Wales) and on Network 10 (Queensland and South Australia).
 The Round 10 match between West Coast and Collingwood was played on the Foundation Day public holiday, which is not observed in Victoria.
 In awful conditions in Round 13, Collingwood kicked only 2.6 (18), the lowest score by any team since 1968. Brian Taylor kicked their only goals in the first few minutes of the second quarter.
 In three home games from Round 16 to Round 18, the Sydney Swans amassed the most prolific string of high scores in VFL history, scoring a total of 97.53 (635). Their individual scores were: 30.21 (201) against West Coast, winning by 130 points; 36.20 (236) against Essendon, winning by 163 points; and 31.12 (198) against Richmond, winning by 91 points.
The league had considered rescheduling the match as the first half of a double-header with one of the other two senior matches that weekend to reduce overall operating expenses, but contracts already in place precluded double-headers from being staged.
 Melbourne ended the third-longest finals drought in league history (twenty-two seasons) by finishing fifth, making the finals for the first time since 1964.
The Under-19s Grand Final, in which  13.16 (94) defeated  13.11 (89), ended in controversy when the final siren was alleged to have been blown early. The timekeeper, who was independent of the clubs, was alleged to have blown the siren after only two minutes of time on; but there had been five goals kicked in the final quarter, which would usually have been expected to result in four or five minutes of time on. Richmond lodged a complaint against the timekeeper, but did not protest the result or seek a replay of the match.

See also
 McIntyre "final five" system

References

 Stephen Rodgers: Every Game Ever Played VFL/AFL Results 1897–1991 3rd Edition 1992. Penguin Books Australia .
 1987 Season - AFL Tables

Australian Football League seasons
VFL season